Sofia Yfantidou (Greek: Σοφία Υφαντίδου; also transcribed in English Ifadidou; born 10 January 1985) is a Greek track and field athlete. She competed at the 2012 Summer Olympics in the women's heptathlon event. She finished 24th, with 5947 points, achieving an Olympic record (OHB) at the heptathlon event of javelin throw with 56.96 metres.

Competition record

Personal bests

References

External links

Living people
1985 births
Greek heptathletes
Greek female athletes
Olympic athletes of Greece
Athletes (track and field) at the 2012 Summer Olympics
Athletes (track and field) at the 2016 Summer Olympics
World Athletics Championships athletes for Greece
Mediterranean Games silver medalists for Greece
Athletes (track and field) at the 2013 Mediterranean Games
Sportspeople from Veria
Mediterranean Games medalists in athletics
European Games competitors for Greece
Athletes (track and field) at the 2019 European Games
Competitors at the 2009 Summer Universiade
21st-century Greek women